Catjang (Vigna unguiculata subsp. cylindrica) is a subspecies of cowpea. The catjang plant is native to Africa, and is an erect densely branched shrubby perennial of Old World tropics. It now grows in other warm regions, as well. In the US, it is grown primarily as fodder, but elsewhere is used as a food crop. The name comes from Indonesian and Malay word kacang, a generic word for beans and nuts.

Nutrition 
Catjang is low in saturated fat and is a good source of dietary fiber, protein, iron, phosphorus, zinc, copper and manganese, and a very good source of folate and magnesium.

References 

Vigna
Edible legumes
Plant subspecies